Epiactaeodes is a genus of crabs in the family Xanthidae, containing the following species:

 Epiactaeodes pictus (Zehntner, 1894)
 Epiactaeodes tesselatus (Pocock, 1890)

References

Xanthoidea